The inauguration of John Magufuli as the 5th President of Tanzania took place on Thursday, 5 November 2015. It marked the commencement of the first five-year term of John Magufuli as President and Samia Suluhu as Vice President.

Magufuli won the 2015 presidential election, receiving 58% of the vote. Outgoing President Jakaya Kikwete declared the day as a public holiday.

Attendance

Dignitaries

Government representatives

Former leaders

International organizations

References

External links
 

Tanzanian presidential inaugurations